The MY Lady Anastasia  (formerly Aria) is a  luxury motor yacht. The luxury yacht was built in 2001 by Sensation Yachts. In 2022, the yacht became embroiled with the fallout from the Russo-Ukrainian War, with a crew member attempting to scuttle it, and authorities seizing it pursuant to sanctions against Russia.

History
In 2001, the yacht was launched by Sensation Yachts in New Zealand. She was launched under the name Aria.

In 2018, the yacht was placed on sale.

In February 2022, chief engineer Taras Ostapchuk tried to sabotage and sink the superyacht by intentional scuttling through opening the seacocks, at Port Adriano, Palma, Mallorca, Spain. He was unsuccessful as other crew members were alerted by alarm and rescued the ship. Ostapchuk attempted to take action against the head of Rosoboronexport, arms oligarch and yacht owner Aleksandr Mikheyev, in revenge for Russia attacking Kyiv during the 2022 Russian invasion of Ukraine.

In March 2022, Spanish authorities seized the yacht pursuant to European Union sanctions against Mikheev.

Specifications

 Designer: Donald Starkey
 Naval architect: Ray Harvey
 Shipyard: Sensation Yachts, Auckland, 
 Length: 
 Beam: 
 Draft: 
 Gross tonnage: 476
 Decks: 4
 Guests: 10
 Crew: 9
 Cabins: 5
 Propulsion: 2 ×  diesel, twin-screw

Registration

 Flag nation: 
 
 
 Callsign: J8Y4288
 Home port: Kingstown

Further reading
 Yachting International Radio,  (28 February 2022)
 Breed Media, Imperial Yachts,  (8 July 2020)

References

Motor yachts
2001 establishments